Tom Smith (15 August 1920 – 3 April 2009) was a British make-up artist who was nominated at the 1982 Academy Awards for Best Makeup for the film Gandhi.
He was also known for the make-up in Raiders of the Lost Ark and Return of the Jedi.

He died of a heart attack on 3 April 2009 at the age of 88.

Selected filmography

Indiana Jones and the Temple of Doom (1984)
Return of the Jedi (1983)
Gandhi (1982)
Raiders of the Lost Ark (1981)
The Shining (1980)
A Bridge Too Far (1977)
The Land That Time Forgot (1975)
Sleuth  (1972)
The Horror of Frankenstein (1970)
Anne of the Thousand Days (1969)
The Fearless Vampire Killers (1967)
The Haunting (1963)
Around the World in 80 Days (1956-uncredited)

References

External links

1920 births
2009 deaths
British make-up artists
BAFTA winners (people)